Ontario Genomics, formerly the Ontario Genomics Institute, is a not-for-profit organization that manages genomics research projects and platforms. Ontario Genomics is funded by the Ontario government and the federal research funding agency Genome Canada.

History 
Ontario Genomics was established in 2000, following a landmark decision by the Canadian Government to support the science of genomics.

Since its inception, Ontario Genomics has:
 Raised more than $1 billion for genomics research in Ontario and directly supported 7300 R&D jobs
 Secured over $375 M federal Genome Canada funds, $103 M provincial (Ministry of Research Innovation and Science) co-funding, and $180 M direct industry investments for Ontario genomics research programs.
 Brought 16 genomics companies to the “investor-ready” stage and helped secure $197 M follow on funding. These companies created 289 private sector jobs and generated $56.3 M in revenue.

External links 
 Ontario Genomics Synthetic Biology Report 2016
 Ontario Genomics Health Data Report - Call for a Health Data Ecosystem
 Genome Canada
 Ministry of Research, Innovation and Science

Genetics organizations